Seminar is a form of academic instruction, either at an academic institution or offered by a commercial or professional organization.

Seminar may refer to:
 Seminar (play), a 2011 Broadway play by Theresa Rebeck
 Seminar (album), 1989 album by Sir Mix-a-Lot
"The Seminar" (The Office), a 2011 episode American comedy television series The Office
 Seminar, monthly journal established in 1959 by Romesh Thapar and Raj Thapar